Tizi Mahdi is a town and commune in Médéa Province, Algeria.

References

Communes of Médéa Province